The Toulouse tramway is a two-line tram system in Toulouse, Midi-Pyrénées, France, and operates from Toulouse to the suburb of Beauzelle, passing through Blagnac. Including the three-station,  branch line of Line T2 which opened in April 2015, the entire Toulouse tramway serves 27 stations and is based on the Alstom Citadis 302 family of low-floor trains.

The system and its fare structure is incorporated into the Tisséo network of Toulouse, which also includes the Toulouse Metro.



Line T1 

It was originally planned that the Line T1 tramway would open on 27 November 2010, but industrial action delayed the opening to December 2010.

An extension of Tram Line T1 of almost four kilometers from the original southern terminus at Arènes to Garonne and Palais de Justice, allowing direct transfer between the tram and Toulouse Metro Line B, has been open in December 2013.

A  northern extension serving a new exposition centre opened in August 2020 and three existing stops had their names changed.

Line T2 

Line T2 was originally a  branch of line T1 called Line Envol (literally Takeoff) running from Jean Maga roundabout, between stations Ancely and Servanty-Airbus, to the Airport. But before its opening, it was finally commercially dissociate from line T1 and opened on 11 April 2015.

The line is the same as line T1 between Palais de Justice and Ancely, then it continues to the Airport with 2 new stations between, Nadot and Daurat.

By the opening of third line of Toulouse Metro in 2025, line T2 will become the Aéroport Express (Airport Express) line between a new Jean Maga station and Airport only.

Map

See also 
 Toulouse Metro
 List of Toulouse metro stations
 Trams in France
 List of town tramway systems in France

References

External links 

   

Rapid transit in France
Transport in Toulouse
Railway lines opened in 2010
Tram transport in France
Town tramway systems by city